MyNewPlace is an apartment listing websites in the United States. MyNewPlace is headquartered in San Francisco in the SoMa neighborhood, but is owned by RealPage based out of Carrollton, Texas.

History
MyNewPlace was founded by John Helm in 2005, and went live in May 2006 with 6 million apartment listings nationwide. The San Francisco-based company operates on a Pay-per-Qualified-Lead pricing model, in which apartment managers pay only when renters contact them through their listings on MyNewPlace.

John Helm had previously started AllApartments/SpringStreet, which became the internet's biggest apartment rental site before its sale to Homestore/Move.com in 1999.

Investors
MyNewPlace was initially backed by SplitRock Partners, Sutter Hill Ventures, and Trinity Ventures, and is also backed by some of a number of real estate investment trusts, including United Dominion Realty Trust (UDR), Essex Property Trust, Marcus & Millichap Venture Partners, ConAm Management Corporation, The Lane Company, and Cowboy Properties.

In August 2011 MyNewPlace was bought by national real estate company RealPage for $74.4 million.

References

External links
 MyNewPlace.com

Real estate companies established in 2005
Online real estate databases